Fun Factory Uganda is a Ugandan entertainment company based in Kampala. It was founded in 2010, with its flagship product being sketch comedy. It also has branched into television shows and event management. FFU's cast are trained at Makerere University School of Liberal and Performing Arts. Their products include Comedicine, U-Turn, and Mizigo Express.

History

Founding
Fun Factory Uganda got its start when fourteen members of Theatre Factory had a misunderstanding with the group's administration and
broke away to form their own troupe on 5 January 2010, leaving only two members in the original Theatre Factory group.

2010–2019: The hustle begins
FFU's inaugural show was on 14 January 2010, performing at Pan World parking lot. They then proceeded to perform weekly on the same days and times that they used to at the National Theatre, where they attracted many youth and other fans. With an ever-growing audience, the management of the parking lot increased the group's rent, causing them to shift to the Hotel Africana poolside. After a few months, they had a disagreement with the hotel management, and had to relocate again, this time to Cinema Plaza. However, things were more challenging there, so they decided to search for a new location. They finally came to a mutual understanding with the National Theatre.

Comedicine
Comedicine  is a sketch comedy created by FFU that has aired on a weekly basis. since inception of the group, except the first weeks of 2018. The show's success attracted soft drink brand Mirinda to partner with Fun Factory in the regional Mirinda Comedy tour in 2014.

Guest appearances 
 Daniel Omara
 Akite Agnes
 Okello Okello
 Patrick Salvador Idringi
 Don Andre

End-of-year shows
Fun Factory Uganda has been hosting an end-of-year show called Five Star Madness since 2014.

2014 - Five Star Madness

2015 - Five Star Madness

2016 - Five Star Madness

2019 - Five Star Madness

U-Turn
U-Turn is a television show filmed and produced from live shows that take place every Thursday. Originally, it was called Barbed Wire, under Theatre Factory, but when the members formed Fun Factory, they recreated the show and renamed it. In 2012, U-Turn, was voted as the second best locally produced show on TV. Following an annual survey by Synovate, U-Turn was the most watched entertainment TV show in Uganda. This prompted Mirinda, the show's sponsor, to come to an agreement and air U-Turn on NBS So, in 2015, U-Turn started airing on NBS TV.

Mizigo ExpressMizigo Express is a sitcom produced by Fun Factory. It premiered on 3 October 2018.

Discography
 Yambala Mask Weekume WekaFilmography

Awareness campaigns
 April 2015 – Comedicine was used in an awareness campaign when FFU partnered with the Citizens' Coalition for Electoral Democracy in Uganda (CCEDU), in order to encourage people to register to vote.
 April 2015 – Raised 2 million shillings from the show Organised Chaos'' to help with treatment of Rosemary Nankabirwa, a former news anchor with NTV Uganda.

See also
 Anne Kansiime
 Akite Agnes
 Herbert Ssegujja

References

External links
 Fun Factory Uganda on Facebook
 Fun Factory Uganda on YouTube

Entertainment companies based in Uganda
Television sketch shows
Television series based on comedy sketches
2010s sitcoms
Ugandan comedy television series